Nikulino is a rural locality (a village) in Tolpukhovskoye Rural Settlement, Sobinsky District, Vladimir Oblast, Russia. The population was 5 as of 2010.

Geography 
The village is located 5 km south-west from Tolpukhovo, 19 km north from Sobinka.

References 

Rural localities in Sobinsky District